Sergei Aleksandrovich Pakhomov (born August 8, 1975, Zagorsk, Moscow Oblast) is a Russian political figure and a deputy of the 7th and 8th State Dumas. In 2005, Pahomov was granted a Candidate of Sciences in History degree. 

In 2004, Pakhomov joined the United Russia. The same year, he started working at the Government of the Moscow Oblast. In 2005, Pakhomov served at the Government of Moscow and, later, at the Government of Ivanovo Oblast. From 2005 to 2008, he was the Deputy Chairman of the Government of the Ivanovo Oblast, Head of the Public Relations and Regional Policy Complex. From 2008 to 2013, he was the deputy and the chairman of the Ivanovo Oblast Duma of the 5th and 6th convocations. In December 2013, Pkhomov was appointed the First Deputy Head of Administration of the Sergiyevo-Posadsky District. He headed the district from February 16, 2014, to September 23, 2016. In September 2016, he was elected deputy of the 7th State Duma. In 2021, he was re-elected for the 8th State Duma from the Sergiyev-Posad constituency.

References

1975 births
Living people
United Russia politicians
21st-century Russian politicians
Eighth convocation members of the State Duma (Russian Federation)
People from Sergiyev Posad
Members of the Federation Council of Russia (after 2000)
Seventh convocation members of the State Duma (Russian Federation)